2 Paoni - Coptic calendar - 4 Paoni

Fixed commemorations
All fixed commemorations below are observed on 3 Paoni (10 June) by the Coptic Orthodox Church.

Saints
Saint Martha of Egypt
Saint Hilarion the Bishop
Pope Cosmas I of Alexandria (446 A.M.) (730 A.D.)
Saint Abraam, Bishop of Fayoum and Giza (1630 A.M.) (1914 A.D.)

Commemorations
Consecration of the Church of Saint George in the cities of Birma and Beer Maa.

References
Coptic Synexarion

Days of the Coptic calendar